The African Zone VI Athletics Championships was an annual international athletics competition between Southern African nations, organised by the Confederation of African Athletics (CAA). First held in 1987, it was held each year until 1990 and discontinued completely after 1995, as it was replaced by the African Southern Region Athletics Championships, due to the CAA changing its regional championship formatting.

An African Zone VI Marathon Championships was also held on one occasion in 1989. It was hosted by Swaziland in Mbabane and the hosts won both the men's individual and team titles, led by Tom Dlamini in 2:24:34 hours.

Editions

Events
The competition programme features 34 regular athletics events: seven track running events, two obstacle events, three jumps, three throws, and two relays for both the sexes.

Track running
100 metres, 200 metres, 400 metres, 800 metres, 1500 metres, 5000 metres, 10,000 metres
Obstacle events
100 metres hurdles (women only), 110 metres hurdles (men only), 400 metres hurdles, 
Jumping events
High jump, long jump, triple jump
Throwing events
Shot put, discus throw, javelin throw, hammer throw (men only)
Relay races
4 × 100 metres relay, 4 × 400 metres relay

A men's 20K run was included in 1987 and 1989. A men's decathlon was held in 1990 and in 1989 a men's nonathlon (no pole vault) and women's heptathlon was held. A men's 5000 metres race walk was contested in 1990. Men's pole vault was held on three occasions only, and women never competed in this event. A women's 400 m hurdles was first held in 1989 and a women's triple jump was introduced in 1995. For the first four editions, women competed in the 3000 metres rather than the standard 5000 m. A women's 4 × 200 metres relay was held once in 1989.

Participation

Men's champions

100 metres
1987: 
1988: 
1989: 
1990: 
1995:

200 metres
1987: 
1988: 
1989: 
1990: 
1995:

400 metres
1987: 
1988: 
1989: 
1990: 
1995:

800 metres
1987: 
1988: 
1989: 
1990: 
1995:

1500 metres
1987: 
1988: 
1989: 
1990: 
1995:

5000 metres
1987: 
1988: 
1989: 
1990: 
1995:

10,000 metres
1987: 
1988: 
1989: 
1990: 
1995:

20K run
1987: 
1988: Not held
1989:

3000 metres steeplechase
1987: 
1988: 
1989: 
1990: 
1995:

110 metres hurdles
1987: 
1988: Not held
1989: 
1990: 
1995:

400 metres hurdles
1987: 
1988: Not held
1989: 
1990: 
1995:

High jump
1987: 
1988: 
1989: 
1990: 
1995:

Pole vault
1987: 
1988: Not held
1989: Not held
1990: 
1995:

Long jump
1987: 
1988: 
1989: 
1990: 
1995:

Triple jump
1987: 
1988: 
1989: 
1990: 
1995:

Shot put
1987: 
1988: 
1989: 
1990: 
1995:

Discus throw
1987: 
1988: 
1989: 
1990: 
1995:

Hammer throw
1987: 
1988: Not held
1989: Not held
1990: 
1995:

Javelin throw
1987: 
1988: 
1989: 
1990: 
1995:

Combined events
A nonathlon was held in 1989, featuring the same events as the decathlon minus the pole vault, before a full decathlon was held in 1990
1989: 
1990:

5000 metres walk
1990:

4 × 100 metres relay
1987: 
1988: 
1989: 
1990: 
1995:

4 × 400 metres relay
1987: 
1988: 
1989: 
1990: 
1995:

Women's champions

100 metres
1987: 
1988: 
1989: 
1990: 
1995:

200 metres
1987: 
1988: 
1989: 
1990: 
1995:

400 metres
1987: 
1988: 
1989: 
1990: 
1995:

800 metres
1987: 
1988: 
1989: 
1990: 
1995:

1500 metres
1987: 
1988: 
1989: 
1990: 
1995:

3000 metres
1987: 
1988: 
1989: 
1990:

5000 metres
1995:

10,000 metres
1987: 
1988: Not held
1989: 
1990: 
1995:

100 metres hurdles
1987: 
1988: Not held
1989: 
1990: 
1995:

400 metres hurdles
1989: 
1990: 
1995:

High jump
1987: 
1988: 
1989: 
1990: 
1995:

Long jump
1987: 
1988: 
1989: 
1990: 
1995:

Triple jump
1995:

Shot put
1987: 
1988: 
1989: 
1990: 
1995:

Discus throw
1987: 
1988: 
1989: 
1990: 
1995:

Javelin throw
1987: 
1988: 
1989: 
1990: 
1995:

Heptathlon
1989:

4 × 100 metres relay
1987: 
1988: 
1989: 
1990: 
1995:

4 × 200 metres relay
1989:

4 × 400 metres relay
1988: 
1989: 
1990: 
1995:

References

Champions
African Zone VI Championships. GBR Athletics. Retrieved 2021-01-22.

Confederation of African Athletics competitions
Sport in Southern Africa
Recurring sporting events established in 1987
Recurring sporting events disestablished in 1995